Italy competed at the 2004 Summer Paralympics in Athens, Greece. The team included 76 athletes, 62 men and 14 women. Competitors from Italy won 19 medals, including 4 gold, 8 silver and 7 bronze to finish 31st in the medal table.

Medalists

Sports

Archery

Men

|-
|align=left|Daniele Cassiani
|align=left|Men's individual W1
|386
|12
|N/A
|L 114-164
|colspan=4|did not advance
|-
|align=left|Salvartore Carrubba
|align=left rowspan=3|Men's individual W2
|555
|29
|L 126-155
|colspan=5|did not advance
|-
|align=left|Oscar de Pellegrin
|626
|2
|Bye
|W 151-147
|W 94-91
|L 97-98
|L 96-104
|4
|-
|align=left|Marco Vitale
|568
|24
|W 153-137
|L 139-158
|colspan=4|did not advance
|-
|align=left|Salvatore Carrubba Oscar de Pellegrin Marco Vitale
|align=left|Men's team
|1749
|10
|N/A
|W *197-197
|L 223-226
|colspan=3|did not advance
|}

Women

|-
|align=left|Paola Fantato
|align=left rowspan=3|Women's individual W1/2
|570
|4
|N/A
|W 154-127
|W 85-80
|W 96-88
|W 97-83
|
|-
|align=left|Anna Menconi
|514
|14
|N/A
|L 128-129
|colspan=4|did not advance
|-
|align=left|Sandra Truccolo
|533
|12
|N/A
|L 117-119
|colspan=4|did not advance
|-
|align=left|Paola Fantato Anna Menconi Sandra Truccolo
|align=left|Women's team
|1617
|6
|colspan=2|N/A
|W 201-176
|W 205-194
|L 157-184
|
|}

Athletics

Men's track

Men's field

Women's track

Women's field

Cycling

Men's road

Men's track

Equestrian

Judo

Men

Shooting

Men

Women

Swimming

Men

Women

Table tennis

Men

Women

Wheelchair basketball
The men's wheelchair basketball team didn't win any medals; they were 6th out of 12 teams.

Players
Damiano Airoldi
Fabio Bernadis
Matteo Cavagnini
Salvatore Cherchi
Sandr Cherubini
Sergio Cherubini
Alberto Pellegrini
Mauro Pennino
Fabio Raimondi
Emiliano Rocca
Stefano Rossetti
Ali Mohamed Sanna

Tournament

Wheelchair fencing

Men

Women

Teams

Wheelchair tennis

Men

Quads

See also
Italy at the Paralympics
Italy at the 2004 Summer Olympics

References 

Nations at the 2004 Summer Paralympics
2004
Summer Paralympics